Herbert Wilde (31 July 194025 September 2018) is a German racing cyclist. He rode in the 1967 Tour de France.

References

External links
 

1940 births
Living people
German male cyclists
Place of birth missing (living people)
People from Sigmaringen (district)
Sportspeople from Tübingen (region)
Cyclists from Baden-Württemberg